Goodnight Records is an independent record label and publishing company based in Williamsburg, Brooklyn.  Founded in Atlanta in 2004 by Keith Voglesong and Nathan Jones, Goodnight Records has released records by bands from all over the country and has partnered with larger independent labels such as Merge Records to produce specialty co-releases for their artists.

Roster
 Heliotropes
 The Press
 Askeleton
 Hi Ho Six Shooter
 The Close
 S.I.D.S.
 The Orphins
 The Rosebuds
 Music for People
 Adam Franklin and Bolts of Melody

Discography
 GNR001 - Askeleton Angry Album or Psychic Songs 2004 
 GNR002 - The Orphins Drowning Cupid 2004
 GNR003 - The Rosebuds/The Close Rosebuds/Close Split 7" 2004
 GNR004 - Young Vulgarians Nepoleonic Melodrama 2005
 GNR006 - Music For People Audio Diary of the Typical Gemini 2005
 GNR007 - The Press Noxious Saucy Beast 2005 
 GNR008 - The Rosebuds Birds Make Good Neighbors 2005
 GNR009 - Askeleton (Happy) Album 2005 
 GNR010 - The Press Red Comes Ringin' 7" 2006
 GNR011 - S.I.D.S. My Other Vehicle is a Stretcher 2006 
 GNR012 - The Close Sun, Burn 2006
 GNR013 - Hi Ho Six Shooter Empire 2008
 GNR014 - The Press Milk and the Times that Never Were 2008 
 GNR015 - The Rosebuds Night of the Furies 2007
 GNR016 - Askeleton The Personalization 2008
 GNR017 - The Press Master 7" 2009 
 GNR034 - Adam Franklin & Bolts of Melody Black Horses 2013

References

External links
 Official Page

American independent record labels